Tsinghua International School (THIS) is a non-profit , WASC-accredited international school in Beijing, that was founded in 2009. THIS is attached to one of Beijing's top public secondary schools, Tsinghua Fuzhong. Tsinghua Fuzhong is the secondary school affiliated to Tsinghua University. THIS shares some facilities with Tsinghua Fuzhong, but remains an independent school. The school has around 430 students in grades 1-12. 

THIS is in the Advanced Placement program and its courses are derived from the Common Core State Standards Initiative. The colleges attended by alumni are impressive for a small school, including names like Columbia University, Brown University and MIT.

Facilities
THIS has an elementary school, middle school, and high school. They recently finished the construction of their teaching building with modern classrooms and science labs. In addition, the school just finished construction of an indoor gym. Other facilities include:
 Library
 Science laboratories
 Cafeteria
 Athletics track
 Basketball courts
 Soccer field
 Computer labs
 Soundproof music studio
 Drama studio
 Black Box Theatre
 Teachers' lounge
 Computer lab
 New Multi-story Gym

High school program
The US-based high school curriculum prepares students for colleges in the United States, Canada, and other western countries. Multiple advanced placement courses such as AP World History, AP English Language and Composition, and AP Physics are available, while new courses are being introduced in the future.

Selection for high school courses
 English/Language Arts
 Chinese
 Social Studies
 Visual Arts and Performing Arts
 Foreign Languages and Linguistics
 Mathematics
 Physical Sciences
 Computer Technology
 Physical Education and Health

Student life

Extracurricular activities
THIS teachers provide a variety of after-school extracurricular activities for all elementary school, middle school, and high school students. Activities, including sports, are held every day from 3:30 to 5:30.

THIS is a member of ISAC (International Schools Athletic Conference) and has recently also joined ACAMIS (Association of China and Mongolia International Schools). Middle school and high school extracurricular activities include:

 Dance Club
 Rock/Pop band
 Choir Club
 Community Service Club
 Speech and Debate Club
 MUN (Model United Nations)
 MEAT Club (Middle School Events & Activities Team)
 Engineering Club
Woodworking Club
 SciNex (Science Club)
 Middle School Math Club
 High School Math Club
 Author's Circle
 Traditional Dance Club
 Fashion Design Club
 Theatre
 English Newspaper, The Spartan Times
Chinese Newspaper
 Korean Club
 Japanese Club
 Visual Art Club

Dining service
The catering services at THIS provide breakfast, lunch, and dinner for middle school students, high school students, and faculty members. They serve a variety of dishes that are reasonably priced. Some dishes include noodles, Japanese tofu, and stir-fried rice.

Elementary students have lunch prepared for them beforehand and are given morning snacks every day.

Transportation service
Daily school buses at designated pick-up points before and after school are provided for elementary school, middle school, and high school students. THIS has eleven bus routes for students to choose from across Beijing.

References

International schools in Beijing
Educational institutions established in 2009
2009 establishments in China